Emilie Ringe (born 1984) is an American chemist who is an Assistant Professor at the University of Cambridge. She was selected by Chemical & Engineering News as one of its "Talented Twelve" young scientists in 2021.

Early life and education 
Ringe grew up in Quebec. She was an undergraduate student at Northwestern University, where she graduated in chemistry. She remained at Northwestern for her graduate studies. Her doctoral research developed structure-function relationships of nanoparticles, and how structure and composition impacted the optoelectronic properties. During her graduate studies she started working with electron microscopy.

Research and career 
Ringe joined the University of Cambridge as a Newton International Fellow. She held a joint position at Trinity Hall, where she served as a Gott Research Fellow. She moved to Rice University in 2014, where she established the Electron Microscopy Centre. Ringe returned to the University of Cambridge in 2018, where she held positions in both the Department of Materials and Department of Earth Sciences. Ringe studies plasmonic nanoparticles. When light of the appropriate frequency shines on these plasmonic nanoparticles the nearby electrons start to resonate (so-called localized surface plasmon resonances), and use the light to drive chemical reactions across their surfaces. Plasmonic nanoparticles are typically made of rare and expensive metals, and can suffer from oxidation that affect their optical properties. Ringe was the first to show that magnesium can form effective plasmonic nanoparticles, with different sizes of nanoparticles absorbing light from the ultraviolet to the infrared region of the spectrum. Thin oxide layer forms on the surface of the magnesium nanoparticles, which makes them air stable. By attaching metals to the nanoparticles, Ringe believes they will be useful in photocatalysis or photothermal therapy.

Ringe was awarded a European Research Council Starting Grant to investigate naturally occurring plasmonics in 2019. In 2021, Ringe was selected by Chemical & Engineering News as one of twelve "talented young scientists who are trying to solve formidable global problems."

Ringe has developed scientific teaching materials for people with visual disabilities. She created Crystal Creator, a user-friendly graphic interface to teach crystal structures that makes use of Wulff constructions.

Selected publications

References

External links 
 

1984 births
Living people